Borobia is a municipality located in the province of Soria, Castile and León, Spain. According to the 2004 census (INE), the municipality has a population of 347 inhabitants.  It was the birthplace of conquistador Tristán de Luna y Arellano.

References

Municipalities in the Province of Soria